The 46th Annual Miss Puerto Rico Universe competition was held in the fall of 2000 in Puerto Rico. Denise Quiñones won the pageant and represented Puerto Rico at Miss Universe 2001 in Bayamón, Puerto Rico.

Placements

Judges
Shawn Baker
Teresa Caballero 
Carmen Cedre
Leonardo Cordero
Patricia Eaves
María Fortuno, Miss Puerto Rico Universe 1990
David Latoni
Mayra López
Silverio Pérez
Ingrid Rivera Rocafort
Reinhard Werthner

References

Puerto Rico 2001
2000 beauty pageants
2001 in Puerto Rico